Attala County is a county located in the U.S. state of Mississippi. As of the 2020 census, the population was 17,889. Its county seat is Kosciusko. Attala County is named for Atala, a fictional Native American heroine from an early-19th-century novel of the same name by François-René de Chateaubriand.

Geography
It is bound by the Big Black River, a tributary of the Mississippi River, in the west.

Major roads
  Mississippi Highway 12
  Mississippi Highway 14
  Mississippi Highway 19
  Mississippi Highway 35
  Mississippi Highway 43
 Natchez Trace Parkway

Adjacent counties
 Montgomery County (north)
 Choctaw County (northeast)
 Winston County (east)
 Leake County (south)
 Madison County (southwest)
 Holmes County (west)
 Carroll County (northwest)

National protected area
 Natchez Trace Parkway (part)

Demographics

2020 census

As of the 2020 United States Census, there were 17,889 people, 6,941 households, and 4,735 families residing in the county.

2010 census
As of the 2010 United States Census, there were 19,564 people living in the county, down from its peak in 1940. 56.2% were White, 42.0% Black or African American, 0.3% Asian, 0.2% Native American, 0.7% of some other race and 0.6% of two or more races. 1.7% were Hispanic or Latino (of any race).

2000 census
As of the census of 2000, there were 19,661 people, 7,567 households, and 5,380 families living in the county.  The population density was 27 people per square mile (10/km2).  There were 8,639 housing units at an average density of 12 per square mile (5/km2).  The racial makeup of the county was 58.34% White, 40.00% Black or African American, 0.17% Native American, 0.27% Asian, 0.65% from other races, and 0.57% from two or more races.  1.42% of the population were Hispanic or Latino of any race.

There were 7,567 households, out of which 32.10% had children under the age of 18 living with them, 50.30% were married couples living together, 16.70% had a female householder with no husband present, and 28.90% were non-families. 26.40% of all households were made up of individuals, and 14.50% had someone living alone who was 65 years of age or older.  The average household size was 2.55 and the average family size was 3.07.

In the county, the population was spread out, with 25.90% under the age of 18, 9.20% from 18 to 24, 25.20% from 25 to 44, 22.40% from 45 to 64, and 17.30% who were 65 years of age or older.  The median age was 37 years. For every 100 females there were 91.50 males.  For every 100 females age 18 and over, there were 86.70 males.

The median income for a household in the county was $24,794, and the median income for a family was $30,796. Males had a median income of $26,180 versus $17,394 for females. The per capita income for the county was $13,782.  About 18.30% of families and 21.80% of the population were below the poverty line, including 28.60% of those under age 18 and 21.40% of those age 65 or over.

Communities

Cities
 Kosciusko (county seat)

Towns
 Ethel
 McCool
 Sallis

Unincorporated communities
 Hesterville
 McAdams
 Possumneck
 Williamsville
 Zama

Ghost towns
 Sand Hill
 Valena

Notable people
 Myrtis Methvin was elected in 1932 as the second woman mayor in Louisiana and took office in Castor in Bienville Parish, serving from 1933 to 1945. She was born in Attala County in 1895.
John D. Winters, a historian of the American Civil War, was born in Attala County in 1917.
The Choctaw Chief Kiliahote was born here in 1826.

Politics

See also
 Dry county
 National Register of Historic Places listings in Attala County, Mississippi

References

External links
 Attala County Courthouse Pictures
 Attala County GenWeb

 
Mississippi counties
Mississippi placenames of Native American origin
1833 establishments in Mississippi
Populated places established in 1833